Joaquin "Chino" Roces (June 29, 1913 – September 30, 1988) was the founder of Associated Broadcasting Corporation (now known as TV5) and a former owner of The Manila Times.

Early life
Roces was born on June 29, 1913, to Alejandro "Moy" Roces and Antonia "Nena" Pardo from San Miguel, Manila.  He had seven siblings: Ramón Roces,  Filomena "Nenita " Roces de Verzosa, Isabel "Bebeng" Roces, Mercedes Roces, Rafael "Tuti" Roces, Antonia "Chucha" Roces de Prieto and Marcos "Taling" Roces.

He started his publishing career at his father's newspaper chain TVT (Tribune - La Vanguardia - Taliba) before World War II.  Don Chino later headed the Roces family media empire composed of newspapers The Manila Times, Daily Mirror, Sunday Times, Taliba, Women's Magazine Variety, and the Associated Broadcasting Corporation, which first consisted of radio stations DZMT-AM, DZTM-AM, and DZWS-AM and  the television station DZTM-TV. He also organized media groups, the Philippine News Agency (PNA), and Philippine Press Institute.

Roces was arrested and jailed when Martial Law was imposed in 1972, together with Ninoy Aquino, Pepe Diokno, Lorenzo Tanada and other journalists. As soon as he was released, he took to the streets to openly protest the Marcos government. After the assassination of Benigno "Ninoy" Aquino Jr. in 1983, he further intensified his protest and during a vigil on Mendiola Bridge, Roces was drenched by water cannons.

On October 15, 1985, Roces founded the Cory Aquino for President Movement (CAPM). It was launched at the National Press Club. He gathered over one million signatures from all over the nation to draft Corazon Aquino to run against Marcos.

After the EDSA revolution he returned to publishing, first joining forces with Geny Lopez at the Manila Chronicle, and then later once more the publisher of the family owned The Manila Times.

On July 22, 1988, President Aquino conferred on him the Philippine Legion of Honor Award (degree of chief Commander), the highest honor the country can bestow on a civilian.

Personal life
He was married to Dona Pacita Carvajal and had four children namely: Joaquin "Joaqui" Roces Jr., Arturo Roces, Edgardo "Eddie" C. Roces, and Rocio Rosalinda Antonia Roces.

Death
He died of cancer on September 30, 1988, at the age of 75 in Manila, Philippines.

In that same year, Pasong Tamo Street, one of the main roads in  Makati, was renamed Chino Roces Avenue in his honor.

Legacy

References

See also
 Leonard Peltier

1913 births
1988 deaths
20th-century Filipino businesspeople
Filipino media executives
People from San Miguel, Manila
Ateneo de Manila University alumni
Deaths from cancer in the Philippines
TV5 Network executives
Filipino company founders
Filipino television company founders
Individuals honored at the Bantayog ng mga Bayani
Journalists honored at the Bantayog ng mga Bayani
Marcos martial law victims